George Conway may refer to:
 George Conway, American lawyer
 George C. Conway (1900–1969), American politician
 George H. Conway (1878–1939), American horse trainer
 George Robert Graham Conway (1873–1951), Mexican civil engineer and historian